Sandy Green may refer to:

 Sandy Green (mathematician) (1926–2014), English mathematician
 Sandy Green (singer) (born 1987), English singer and songwriter